Abbasabad (also Romanized as ‘Abbāsābād and Abasabad) is a village in Mavazekhan-e Shomali Rural District, Khvajeh District, Heris County, East Azerbaijan Province, Iran. At the 2006 census, its population was 252, in 52 families.

References 

Populated places in Heris County